Kus is a god of herdsmen in Sumerian, Babylonian, and Akkadian mythology. He is identified in the Theogony of Dunnu.

References 
Michael Jordan, Encyclopedia of Gods, Kyle Cathie Limited, 2002

Mesopotamian gods

Pastoral gods